Otar Tushishvili (born 14 June 1978 in Gori) is a Georgian wrestler, who has won a bronze medal at the 2008 Summer Olympics.

References

External links
 Beijing Olympics
 

1978 births
Living people
Male sport wrestlers from Georgia (country)
Olympic wrestlers of Georgia (country)
Wrestlers at the 2000 Summer Olympics
Wrestlers at the 2004 Summer Olympics
Wrestlers at the 2008 Summer Olympics
Wrestlers at the 2012 Summer Olympics
Olympic bronze medalists for Georgia (country)
Olympic medalists in wrestling
Medalists at the 2008 Summer Olympics
World Wrestling Championships medalists
Universiade medalists in wrestling
Universiade medalists for Georgia (country)